The Amazing Race Canada 2 is the second season of The Amazing Race Canada, a reality game show based on the American series The Amazing Race. It features eleven teams of two, each with a pre-existing relationship in a race across Canada and across the world and is hosted by Jon Montgomery. The grand prize includes a  cash payout, two Chevrolet Silverado "High Country Edition" trucks, free gasoline for life from Petro-Canada and the ability to fly for free anywhere for a year with Air Canada in business class.

The season premiered on July 8, 2014 with the season finale airing on September 21, 2014.

Best friends Michael "Mickey" Henry and Peter "Pete" Schmalz were the winners of this season.

Production

Development and filming

On September 16, 2013, CTV announced that the show was renewed for the second season during the first season's reunion special.

Unlike the first season, this season travelled to destinations outside of Canada like other international Amazing Race counterparts.

Surfer Mathea Olin appeared as the Pit Stop greeter during Leg 2. Leg 3 featured MasterChef Canada judge Alvin Leung as a judge for the "Master Chef" task and Hong Kong-Canadian actress Jennifer Tse, who greeted the teams in the Pit Stop on the same leg.  Royal Winnipeg Rifles veteran Jim Parks appeared as the Pit Stop greeter for Leg 7 at Juno Beach, not far from where he alongside other men from the 7th Brigade, 3rd Canadian Infantry Division fought ashore during D-Day.

This was the first (and to date, currently the only) season in the Canadian version not to feature a no-rest leg.

Marketing
Air Canada and Chevrolet retain their sponsorship from the first season. The new prize includes receiving a gas supply from Petro-Canada and each leg prize includes cash from Scotiabank.

Broadcasting
After episode 6, a special mid-season reunion/recap titled "After The Race" aired. Hosted by James Duthie, the program reviewed the events of the first 6 episodes with the first 5 eliminated teams. A second "After The Race" special that was again hosted by Duthie, aired immediately after the season finale with all the teams present to review the season as a whole.

Cast
Casting began in November 2013, with an online site for submission of applications and audition videos. The first three teams were revealed on June 17, 2014, with the remaining teams announced on June 18 and June 20. The contestants include ice hockey players and gold medalists Natalie Spooner and Meaghan Mikkelson, ballet dancer Rex Harrington as well as comedian Ryan Steele from The Ryan and Amy Show.

Alain Chanoine proposed to Audrey Tousignant-Maurice at the Pit Stop of Leg 8, and she accepted.

Results
The following teams participated in this season, each listed along with their placements in each leg and relationships as identified by the program. Note that this table is not necessarily reflective of all content broadcast on television, owing to the inclusion or exclusion of some data. Placements are listed in finishing order:

A  placement with a dagger indicates that the team was eliminated.
An  placement with a double-dagger indicates that the team was the last to arrive at a pit stop in a non-elimination leg, and had to perform a Speed Bump task in the following leg.
 An italicized and underlined placement indicates that the team was the last to arrive at a pit stop, but there was no rest period at the pit stop and all teams were instructed to continue racing. There was no required Speed Bump task in the next leg.
A  indicates that the team won the Fast Forward.
A  indicates that the team used an Express Pass on that leg to bypass one of their tasks.
 A  indicates that the team used the U-Turn and a  indicates the team on the receiving end of the U-Turn.

Notes

Prizes
The prize for each leg is awarded to the first place team for that leg. Trips are sponsored by Air Canada and cash prizes by Scotiabank.

Leg 1 – Two round-trip tickets to any South American destination served by Air Canada, 2,000, and two Express Passes.
Leg 2 – Two round-trip tickets to Hong Kong and 2,000.
Leg 3 – Two round-trip tickets to any China destination served by Air Canada and 2,000.
Leg 4 – Two round-trip tickets in Premium Economy-Class to Tokyo and 3,000.
Leg 5 – Two round-trip tickets to any "Sun destination" served by Air Canada Rouge and 3,000.
Leg 6 – All inclusive vacation to Los Cabos, Mexico and 3,000.
Leg 7 – Two round-trip tickets to any Europe destination served by Air Canada and 3,000.
Leg 8 – Two-round-trip tickets to any Europe destination served by Air Canada Rouge and 3,000.
Leg 9 – Two-round-trip tickets to Milan, Italy and 3,000.
Leg 10 – Two round-trip tickets to any Canada destination served by Air Canada and 5,000.
Leg 11 – Two round-trip tickets to any United States destination served by Air Canada and 5,000.
Leg 12 – A CA$250,000 cash payout, "gas for life" from Petro-Canada, the opportunity to fly for a year anywhere Air Canada flies worldwide in Business Class, and two Chevrolet Silverado trucks.
Canada's Favourite Racers – A year's supply of gas from Petro-Canada awarded to the "fan favourite" team (according to an online vote). Awarded to Natalie & Meaghan during the second reunion show.

 An item that can be used to skip any one task of the team's choosing up and until the eighth leg. The winning team keeps one for themselves and may give the second to another team before the end of the fifth leg.

Race summary

Leg 1 (Alberta → British Columbia)

Airdate: July 8, 2014
Jasper National Park, Alberta, Canada (Athabasca Glacier) (Starting Line)
Calgary (WinSport Canada Olympic Park – Frank King Day Lodge)
 Calgary (Calgary International Airport) to Victoria, British Columbia (Victoria International Airport)
Sidney (Viscount Aero Centre) 
Victoria (Willows Beach)
Victoria (The Fairmont Empress) 
 Victoria (Victoria Harbour – Inner Harbour) to Colwood (Canadian Forces Base Esquimalt – Damage Control Training Facility Galiano)
Colwood (Fisgard Lighthouse National Historic Site) 

In this season's first Roadblock, one team member had to tandem skydive  with an instructor onto Willows Beach, where they would reunite with their partner before receiving their next clue from their instructor.

In this leg's second Roadblock, the team member who did not perform the previous Roadblock had to receive an etiquette lesson from hotel staff before serving afternoon tea to the patrons at The Fairmont Empress and reciting the menu options from memory to receive their next clue from the tea master.

Additional tasks
At WinSport Canada Olympic Park, teams had to find the  ski jump and then ride North America's fastest zip line, "The Monster", to receive their next clue, which instructed teams to travel Victoria, British Columbia on one of three flights each departing one hour apart, along with a Scotiabank American Express card that would serve as the teams' source of money for the rest of the season from Olympian Helen Upperton.
At Viscount Aero Centre, teams had to search a vintage 1930's Fleet Model 10D biplane for their Roadblock clue.
At The Fairmont Empress, teams had to search for an Arbutus tree to find their next clue.
At Canadian Forces Base Esquimalt, teams had to complete two Royal Canadian Navy disaster training exercises. First, teams had to use a hose to knock down three weighted buckets in 30 seconds then suppress a simulated helicopter fire enough to retrieve a casualty, which went unaired. Then, teams had to stop a simulated flooding ship from "sinking" by plugging nine gaps in the ship's hull to receive their next clue.

Leg 2 (British Columbia)

Airdate: July 15, 2014
Victoria (The Fairmont Empress) (Pit Start)
 Victoria (Victoria International Airport) to Tofino (Tofino/Long Beach Airport)
Tofino (Wickaninnish Beach)
 Ucluelet (Ucluelet Harbour Seafoods)
Tofino (North Chesterman Beach – "Surf Shack")
 Tofino (South Chesterman Beach)
Tofino (Olsen Road – Crab Dock) 

This season's first Detour was a choice between Sharp Knives or Sharp Eyes. Both Detour options required teams to drive to Ucluelet Harbour. In Sharp Knives, teams had to watch a demonstration and then correctly fillet at least  of rockfish to receive their next clue. Teams had a limited amount of fish. If they ran out without reaching the target, they had to switch Detour options or take a penalty. In Sharp Eyes, teams had to sort through  of assorted Pacific rockfish and separate them into five bins to receive their next clue.

In this leg's Roadblock, one team member had to use driftwood from the beach as well as fishing nets to construct a traditional Tofino deckchair that could hold the builder's weight to receive their next clue.

Additional task
At North Chesterman Beach, teams had to change into wetsuits and then ride from the surf shack to the beach on bicycles with a surfboard. Once at the beach, one team member had to surf a wave for at least three seconds whilst their partner videoed their effort to receive their next clue.

Additional note
Teams had to use Chevrolet Volts as their transportation for this leg.

Leg 3 (British Columbia → Hong Kong)

Airdate: July 22, 2014
Tofino (Pacific Rim National Park Reserve) (Pit Start)
 Nanaimo (Duke Point Ferry Terminal) to Delta (Tsawwassen Ferry Terminal) (Unaired)
 Vancouver (Vancouver International Airport) to Chek Lap Kok, Hong Kong, China (Hong Kong International Airport)
 Tung Chung, Islands District (Tung Chung Terminal) to Ngong Ping (Ngong Ping Terminal)
Ngong Ping (Ngong Ping Village) (Overnight Rest)
Ngong Ping (Tian Tan Buddha)
Wan Chai District
 Wan Chai District (Bo Innovation and Wan Chai Wet Market or Old Wan Chai Swimming Pool Platform) 
Wan Chai District (Canal Road Flyover)  (Unaired)
Central and Western District (Hillier Street – She Wong Lam Snake Restaurant) 
Yau Tsim Mong District (Avenue of Stars – Statue of Bruce Lee)
Kowloon City District (Kowloon Walled City Park) 

This leg's Detour was a choice between Master Chef or Kung Fu Master. In Master Chef, teams had to go to Bo Innovation, where they would find MasterChef Canada judge Alvin Leung, who would hand them a shopping list of 10 items. Teams then had to go to Wan Chai Wet Market and purchase all 10 items and head back. Once Alvin Leung confirmed that teams bought the correct items, he would hand them their next clue. In Kung Fu Master, teams had to suit up in a traditional martial arts uniform and then perform a difficult kung fu routine to the satisfaction of kung fu master Lee to receive their next clue. Natalie & Meaghan used their Express Pass to bypass the Detour.

In this leg's Roadblock, one team member would be first greeted by a snake master, who would choose a serpent and show it to the team member. The master would take out the snake's gallbladder and then the team member had to drink a shot of the snake's bile. They would then have to consume a bowl of snake meat soup to receive their next clue.

Additional tasks
After teams got off the cable car, they had to sign up for a morning blessing. The next day, teams would be blessed by monks and then had to climb up 268 steps to the Tian Tan Buddha to get their next clue.
At the Statue of Bruce Lee, teams had to strike a series of poses, including the famous Bruce Lee pose, for a local film director to receive their next clue.

Leg 4 (Hong Kong → Macau)

Airdate: July 29, 2014
 Central and Western District (Hong Kong–Macau Ferry Terminal) to Freguesia da Sé, Macau (Outer Harbour Ferry Terminal)
Freguesia de São Lourenço (A-Ma Temple)
Freguesia da Sé (Macau Tower) 
Freguesia de São Lourenço (  – Almond Biscuit Store)
 Freguesia de Santo António (Ruins of Saint Paul's) or Freguesia da Sé (Senado Square)
Freguesia de São Francisco Xavier (Grand Lapa Macau)
Freguesia da Sé (Grand Lisboa)
Freguesia da Sé (Praça de Ferreira do Amaral) 

In this leg's Roadblock, one team member had to perform the world's highest bungee jump from a height of  atop the Macau Tower to receive their next clue after returning to the ground.

This leg's Detour was a choice between Stamp It or Stomp It. In Stamp It, teams had to make their way to the Ruins of St. Paul's, where they would pick up a scroll. They then had to search the streets around Senado Square for six shrines, each marked with one of six ancient Chinese symbols. At each station, they had to mark their scroll with a stamp in ink. Once teams returned to the Ruins of St Paul's with six stamps on their scroll, they would receive their next clue. In Stomp It, teams had to head to Senado Square, join a Macanese folk dance troupe, and learn and perform a complicated routine to receive their next clue.

Additional tasks
At the start of the leg, teams were instructed to travel to Hong Kong–Macau Ferry Terminal and sign up for one of two TurboJET ferries to Macau, each with room for four teams and departing thirty minutes apart starting at 4:00 p.m.
At the A-Ma Temple, teams had to perform an ancient ceremony meant to ward off evil spirits – lighting firecrackers – to receive their next clue.
At the Grand Lapa hotel's casino, teams had to correctly deal a game of Fan-Tan to receive their next clue.
At the Grand Lisboa, teams had to search through a series of underground passageways to find their next Pit Stop: Praça de Ferreira do Amaral.

Leg 5 (Macau → Yukon)

Airdate: August 5, 2014
Freguesia da Sé (Kun Iam Statue) (Pit Start)
 Freguesia da Sé (Outer Harbour Ferry Terminal) to Central and Western District, Hong Kong (Hong Kong-Macau Ferry Terminal) (Unaired)
 Chek Lap Kok (Hong Kong International Airport) to Whitehorse, Yukon, Canada (Erik Nielsen Whitehorse International Airport)
Whitehorse (Sky High Wilderness Ranch) (Overnight Rest) 
 Whitehorse (Sky High Ranch Office Building to Whitehorse Copper Trail)
Whitehorse (Grey Mountain – Biathlon Yukon Course) 
Whitehorse (Chadburn Lake Road – Red Trail) 
 Whitehorse (Miles Canyon) 

This leg's Detour was a choice between Make Your Bed or Ride a Sled. In Make Your Bed, teams had to grab two heavy backpacks and then head to a campsite, where they would find to find a locked chest and a key inside a block of ice in a cooler. Then, they had to empty their backpacks, properly build a tent, and set up a campfire to melt the block the ice to retrieve the key that teams could use to open the chest. Once a wilderness expert was satisfied with their setup, teams would receive their next clue. In Ride A Sled, teams first had to select a tag with the names of three dogs from a board at the ranch and then run  on a trail to Fish Lake. There, they had to search through a number of dog harnesses for the ones that match the three dogs they selected. Once they found the harnesses, teams had to correctly put them on the dogs and attach the dogs to the sled. Each team member then had to complete three laps around the frozen lake to receive their next clue.

For their Speed Bump, Sukhi & Jinder had to hook up a  trailer to their Chevrolet Silverado. Then, they had to drive  to a marked parking spot and back their trailer into the spot without hitting any cones before they could continue racing.

In this leg's Roadblock, one team member had to ride a snow bike along a  course in the woods before heading to the shooting range, where the person had to successfully shoot all five targets without missing to receive their next clue. If the shooter missed any targets, they had to start over by running the course again and shoot the remaining targets.

Additional tasks
After spending a night in Sky High Wilderness Ranch, teams would get their breakfast at the ranch kitchen in the morning, along with their next clue. 
At the Red Trail, teams had to portage a canoe from the woods and then paddle down the Yukon River  to the Pit Stop.

Additional notes
During the flight from Hong Kong to Vancouver, teams rode on Air Canada's premium economy class.
Teams had to use Chevrolet Silveradoes as their transportation for this leg.

Leg 6 (Yukon → Manitoba)

Airdate: August 12, 2014
 Whitehorse (Erik Nielsen Whitehorse International Airport) to Winnipeg, Manitoba (Winnipeg James Armstrong Richardson International Airport)
Winnipeg (Manitoba Legislative Building)
Winnipeg (Royal Canadian Mint)
Winnipeg (Portage and Main)
 Winnipeg (Exchange District – The Cube)
 Winnipeg (Downtown Winnipeg – MTS Centre or North End – St. Ivan Suchavsky Ukrainian Orthodox Cathedral)
Winnipeg (Exchange District – Whiskey Dix) 
Winnipeg (Canadian Museum for Human Rights) 

This season's first Fast Forward had teams go to the Exchange District's iconic building "The Cube" and receive a list of partial phrases from a police officer. They then had to search around the district for seven historic ghost sign advertisements on the outside walls of buildings, which would contain the full version of one of their partial phrases. They had to look at the advertisement and fill in the blanks on sheets of paper with what was painted on the building. The first team that had all seven words filled in could return to The Cube and would be awarded the Fast Forward award. Alain & Audrey won the Fast Forward.

This leg's Detour was a choice between Puck It or Pinch It. In Puck It, teams made their way to the MTS Centre, where they had to dress in hockey gear. Team members would take turns guiding a puck down a slalom of cones and would then shoot it at the net, which would be blocked by a wooden goalie with five holes. Teams had to shoot the puck through all five openings, including "the notorious" five-hole, to receive their next clue. In Pinch It, teams made their way to the St. Ivan Suchavsky Cathedral and had to properly make 74 traditional Ukrainian perogies in the basement hall to receive their next clue.

In this leg's Roadblock, one team member had to dress as a glam rock star and had to memorize a rock and roll song. They would then perform it with a band in front of an audience of Winnipeg music-lovers and would receive their next clue if they sang all of the lyrics correctly. Pierre & Michel used their Express Pass given by Natalie & Meaghan to bypass the Roadblock.

Additional tasks
The first clue of the leg told teams to find the Golden Boy, which is the statue atop the Manitoba Legislative Building, to find their next clue.
At the Royal Canadian Mint, teams received coins from ten different countries, out of the many countries that coins are produced for at this mint. They would then have to run along the mint's driveway, where there were a series of flagpoles representing all countries that the mint produced for, and had to match each coin to its nation's flag to receive their next clue.

Leg 7 (Manitoba → France)

Airdate: August 19, 2014
Winnipeg (Portage and Main) (Pit Start)
 Winnipeg (Winnipeg James Armstrong Richardson International Airport) to Paris, France (Charles de Gaulle Airport)
Coquainvilliers, Lower Normandy (Calvados Boulard) 
Le Molay-Littry (Hôtel de Ville)
 Saon (Ferme Élevage de Nesque) or Bayeux (Musée de la Tapisserie de Bayeux Courtyard)
Asnelles (Beach)
Bény-sur-Mer (Bény-sur-Mer Canadian War Cemetery)
Courseulles-sur-Mer (Juno Beach Centre – Remembrance and Renewal Statue)
Courseulles-sur-Mer (Juno Beach) 

In this leg's Roadblock, one team member had to take a sample of calvados from a barrel and use a mathematical formula and tools provided, as well as a demonstration, to distil the calvados to 40% ABV to receive their next clue from the distiller.

This leg's Detour was a choice between Show It or Tell It. In Show It, teams had to travel to Élevage de Nesque and correctly groom a Percheron horse of their choosing. Once the horse was groomed, teams had to correctly braid the horse's mane to receive their next clue. In Tell It, teams travelled to the courtyard of the Bayeux Tapestry Museum, where they were given twelve images of the Norman invasion of England. Using nine descriptions on boards around the courtyard, they had to identify the images that matched up to the descriptions and place them on a board in the correct order to receive their next clue.

Additional tasks
In Asnelles, each team member had to participate in land sailing and complete a circuit ten times to receive their next clue.
At the Bény-sur-Mer Canadian War Cemetery, teams took a moment of reflection for the 2,049 Canadian soldiers buried in the cemetery, before receiving their next clue, along with a Lest We Forget card.
At the Remembrance and Renewal statue at the Juno Beach Centre, teams gave their Lest We Forget card to the Canadian Army D-Day re-enactor stationed there, and he would direct them to the next Pit Stop on Juno Beach.

Leg 8 (France)

Airdate: August 26, 2014
Bayeux (Streets of Bayeux) (Pit Start)
 Bayeux (Gare de Bayeux) to Paris (Gare Saint-Lazare)
Paris (Arc de Triomphe)
Paris (Place du Canada  – Garden of New France)
 Paris (École de la Chambre Syndicale de la Couture Parisienne or Marais District)
Paris (Centre Pompidou)  
Paris (Pont de Grenelle – Île aux Cygnes) 
Paris (Pont de l'Archevêché)
Paris (Port de la Tournelle) 

This leg's Detour was a choice between Haute Couture or Plat du Jour. In Haute Couture, teams made their way to the Ecole de la Chambre Syndicale de la Couture Parisienne, where they had to use the provided tools and materials to cut and sew the fabric for an haute couture dress onto a dress form to the satisfaction of the head of the school to receive their next clue. In Plat du Jour, teams travelled to the Marais District and had to search the chalkboards placed outside of cafés for three marked with Amazing Race flags. Teams had to purchase the marked items from these boards and memorize how to pronounce them in French. They then had to deliver the food to a waiting couple and say the names correctly to receive their next clue.

For their Speed Bump, Ryan & Rob had to learn how to perform the French folk song "Au clair de la lune" on a pair of accordions and play the song in unison for an audience before they could continue racing.

In this leg's Roadblock, one team member had to recreate a local modern art painting using sponsored Mentos candies, by placing the candies onto a board so that the image matched the painting, to receive their next clue from the artist BasteK.

Additional tasks
At Gare de Bayeux, teams had to signed up for one of two trains to Paris arriving one hour apart.
At Place du Canada, teams had to locate Garden of New France and search the area within for their next clue.
At Pont de l'Archevêché, teams had to search around for the Pit Stop, which was located at Port de la Tournelle on the banks of the Seine.

Leg 9 (France → Quebec)

Airdate: September 2, 2014
Paris (Trocadéro overlooking the Eiffel Tower) (Pit Start)
 Paris (Charles de Gaulle Airport) to Montreal, Quebec, Canada (Montréal–Pierre Elliott Trudeau International Airport)
Dorval (Montréal–Pierre Elliott Trudeau International Airport – Air Canada Priority Check-in Counter)
Mirabel (Montréal–Mirabel International Airport – Circuit ICAR) 
Montreal (Atwater Market – Intersection of Avenue Atwater and Rue Saint-Ambroise)
Montreal (Parisian Laundry) 
 Montreal (Espace VERRE or Lachine Canal)
Montreal (Victoria Square – Square-Victoria Metro Station)
Montreal (Montreal Science Centre – Le Belvédère) 

In this leg's Roadblock, one team member had to drive a Chevrolet Camaro SS and complete a two-stage precision driving course. First, they had to perform a quarter drift without spinning out. Then, they had to perform a 180° reverse turn to receive their next clue from their instructor.

This season's second Fast Forward required teams to travel to Parisian Laundry, where they had to select a pose, head into a curtained room, and then strike the pose so that artists could sketch the team. During the session, teams would be asked to pose in their underwear and then eventually naked. If teams were uncomfortable, they could choose to go back to the Detour. The first team to finish their sketching session would win the Fast Forward award. Sukhi & Jinder won the Fast Forward.

This leg's Detour was a choice between Flamed or Grilled. In Flamed, teams had to travel to Espace VERRE and watch a demonstration by a local artist on how to melt glass rods to create beads. They then had to make five different beads that matched those on a sample necklace to receive their next clue from the gallery owner. In Grilled, teams had to search the Lachine Canal for a food stand called Le Cheese, where they would study and sample 10 different grilled cheese sandwiches. Then, teams had to run  to the Le Cheese food truck and correctly identify all grill cheese sandwiches flavors by memory to receive their next clue from Chef Pascal.

Additional tasks
Upon arrival in Montreal, teams had to search for the Air Canada Priority Check-in Counter to receive their next clue.
At the Atwater Market, teams had to locate the intersection of Avenue Atwater and Rue Saint-Ambroise to find their next clue.
At Square-Victoria Metro Station, teams had to search the grounds outside the station entrance for their next clue.

Leg 10 (Quebec → Prince Edward Island)

Airdate: September 9, 2014
Montreal (Place d'Armes) (Pit Start)
 Montreal (Montréal–Pierre Elliott Trudeau International Airport) to Charlottetown, Prince Edward Island (Charlottetown Airport)
Charlottetown (Red Shores Racetrack)
Charlottetown (Province House) 
Cornwall (Petro-Canada Gas Station)
New London (Lucy Maud Montgomery Birthplace)
 New London (Farmland near New London Community Complex)
 Springbrook (Prince Edward Aqua Farms) or New London (Mull Na Beinne Potato Farm)
North Rustico (Farmers' Bank of Rustico) 

In this leg's Roadblock, one team member had to speak to impersonators of friends and family of selected Fathers of Confederation attendees of the 1864 Charlottetown Conference on the grounds of Province House, who would give their delegate's name and a physical description of him. Then, the team member had to go inside and correctly identify from memory the 10 Fathers of Confederation impersonators (George Brown, George-Étienne Cartier, George Coles, Robert B. Dickey, Col. John Hamilton Gray, Hector-Louis Langevin, Thomas D'Arcy McGee, William Henry Pope, Samuel Tilley, Dr. Charles Tupper) to receive their next clue from an impersonator of Father of Confederation and first Prime Minister of Canada, Sir John A. Macdonald.

For their Speed Bump, Ryan & Rob had to dig for three bottles of "moonshine" inside a pile of horse manure before they could continue racing.

This leg's Detour was a choice between Mussel or Mass. In Mussel, teams had to go to Prince Edward Aqua Farms and process  of mussels. They had to suit up, strip all of the mussels from their "socks", where the mussels grew and multiplied in the North Atlantic for the last two years, and place them into a new bin to receive their next clue from the plant manager would give teams their next clue. In Mass, teams travelled to a potato farm, where they had to calculate the weight of over 10 million russet potatoes using a tape measure and a calculator to receive their next clue from Vernon, the potato farmer.

Additional tasks
When teams found a Chevrolet Impalas, their transportation for this leg, at the Charlottetown Airport, they had to search inside the car for their next clue.
At the Red Shores Racetrack, one team member had to carry their partner using a sulky around the racetrack for two laps to receive their next clue. The team member who was carrying their partner had to wear blinders.
At the Petro-Canada gas station in Cornwall, teams had to fill the gas tanks of their Chevrolet Impalas to receive their next clue.

Leg 11 (Prince Edward Island → New Brunswick)

Airdate: September 16, 2014
Charlottetown (Peake's Wharf) (Pit Start)
Shediac, New Brunswick (The World's Largest Lobster ) (Unaired)
Shediac (Dairy Queen)
Hopewell Cape (Albert County Museum)
 Hopewell Cape (Hopewell Rocks)
Harvey (Cape Enrage)  
Harvey (Cape Enrage Lighthouse) 

This season's final Detour was a choice between By Land or By Sea. In By Land, teams first had to get a GPS, then find 10 hidden items (geocaches) using their GPS to receive their next clue. In By Sea, teams first had to locate the Hopewell Rocks and had to learn the maritime tradition of international signal flags. There, they would find a box of 100 different flags and seven nautical messages. They would then run along the beach until they found a code book, where they could memorize the flag codes. Teams then had to go back to the area where they found their box, find the matching flags, then place them up on a pole in the correct order to receive their next clue.

In this leg's Roadblock, one team member had to rappel down the rock face of Cape Enrage, where they would find the first half of their next clue. Then, the team member had to run along the rocky shore, where they had to climb up the rock face to retrieve the second half of their clue.

Additional tasks
At the start of the leg, teams had to drive across the Confederation Bridge to Shediac. There, teams had to find The World's Largest Lobster and search for a lobster fisherman with their next clue, which went unaired.
At the Dairy Queen in Shediac, teams had to serve Blizzards and custom ice cream cakes for an Acadian birthday party to receive their next clue.
After completing the Roadblock, one team member had to correctly secure a safety harness to their partner then, once approved by the safety inspector, zip-line with their partner down to the Pit Stop.

Additional note
Teams had to use Chevrolet Traxs as their transportation for this leg.

Leg 12 (New Brunswick → Ontario)

Airdate: September 21, 2014
Moncton (Moncton 100 Monument) (Pit Start)
 Moncton (Greater Moncton International Airport) to Ottawa, Ontario (Ottawa Macdonald–Cartier International Airport)
Ottawa (Ottawa Macdonald–Cartier International Airport – Air Canada Maple Leaf Lounge)
 Ottawa (Fleet Street Pumping Station to Rideau Canal)
Ottawa (Parliament Hill – Centennial Flame)
Ottawa (Parliament Hill – Centre Block)
Carp (Diefenbunker) 
 Ottawa (Canadian Museum of Nature – Atrium)
Ottawa (National Gallery of Canada – Baroque Room)
Ottawa (Rideau Hall) 

In this leg's first Roadblock, one team member had to enter the Diefenbunker and search among the bunker's vast array of rooms for three of five hidden toys: a helicopter, a tank, a jeep, a plane and a compass. Once they had found three and returned them to the front desk, they would receive their next clue.

In this season's final Roadblock, the team member who did not perform the previous Roadblock had to use a mechanical ascender to climb to the top of the museum's glass atrium, grabbing their next clue along the way. Once at the top, they had to pull themselves along the roof before they could return to their partner.

Additional tasks
Upon arrival in Ottawa, teams had to search for a clue box inside Air Canada Maple Leaf Lounge with their next clue.
At the Fleet Street Pumping Station, teams had to ride inflatable kayaks down the Ottawa River through an Olympic kayaking training course until they reached the Rideau Canal. Then, teams had to find their next clue at the Centennial Flame on Parliament Hill.
At Parliament Hill, teams had to find the office of the Speaker of the House, the Honourable Andrew Scheer, and choose one of three envelopes with a date written on it. They then had to search among the thousands of books stored in his office containing the transcripts of the House of Commons' debates, known as Hansard, for their specified date, figure out which historic Canadian event took place on that date (Mickey & Pete: March 25, 1986 – Introduction of the loonie coin; Natalie & Meaghan: March 30, 1949 – Adoption of "O Canada" in English and French; Ryan & Rob: December 15, 1964 – Introduction of the new Canadian flag) and bring their answer to the librarian at the Library of Parliament to receive their next clue.
At the National Gallery of Canada, teams had to put together an art installation known as 'Paintings from the Race'. They would have to choose from a large selection of paintings, 36 of which depicted places seen on the season (some paintings were of unrelated scenes from other versions of The Amazing Race, including the original American franchise). They would have to arrange these paintings into the correct places on the wall, three for each leg. Once all of the paintings were correct, teams would receive their final clue. The correct paintings were:

{| class="wikitable" style="text-align:center;"
|-
!Leg #
!Location
!colspan=3|Paintings
|-
!1
|Jasper National Park & Victoria
|Athabasca Glacier
|The Empress
|Fisgard Lighthouse
|-
!2
|Tofino
|Ucluelet Harbour Seafoods
|Surfer
|Driftwood Chair
|-
!3
|Hong Kong
|Tian Tan Buddha
|She Wong Lam Snake Restaurant
|Bruce Lee Statue
|-
!4
|Macau
|Macau Tower
|Fan-Tan
|Grand Lapa Hotel
|-
!5
|Whitehorse
|Sky High Wilderness Ranch
|Biathlon Gun
|Miles Canyon
|-
!6
|Winnipeg
|Manitoba Legislative Building
|Whiskey Dix
|Pit Stop Greeter
|-
!7
|Normandy
|Calvados Boulard
|Bény-sur-Mer Canadian War Cemetery
|Juno Beach Centre 
|-
!8
|Paris
|Centre Georges-Pompidou
|Mentos
|Pont de l'Archevêché
|-
!9
|Montreal
|Chevrolet Camaro SS
|Square-Victoria Metro Station
|Pit Stop Greeter
|-
!10
|Prince Edward Island
|Red Shores Racetrack
|Province House
|Lucy Maud Montgomery's House
|-
!11
|New Brunswick
|The World's Largest Lobster
|Cape Enrage
|Cape Enrage Lighthouse
|-
!12
|Ottawa
|Parliament Hill
|Diefenbunker
|Baroque Room
|}

Episode title quotes
Episode titles are often taken from quotes made by the racers.
"What Does It Take to Get a Cup of Tea Around Here?" – Bob
"There's a Fish in My Pants" – Sukhi
"Snakes and Liars" – Producer Named
"They're Harshing Our Mellow" – Mickey
"Who Designs These Torture Tests?" – Rex
"She's the Pierogi Poobah" – Bob
"Lest We Forget" – Non-Racer 
"I Said Yes!" – Audrey
"How Are We Going to Explain This to Mom and Dad?" – Jinder
"Hot Poop" – Rob
"Put the Fun Back in Fundy" – Pete
"Who's Da Bomb?" – Non-Racer

Ratings
DVR ratings are included in Numeris's count.

Notes

References

External links

 02
2014 Canadian television seasons
Television shows filmed in Alberta
Television shows filmed in British Columbia
Television shows filmed in Hong Kong
Television shows filmed in Macau
Television shows filmed in Yukon
Television shows filmed in Winnipeg
Television shows filmed in France
Television shows filmed in Montreal
Television shows filmed in Prince Edward Island
Television shows filmed in New Brunswick
Television shows filmed in Ontario